Pinking may refer to:
Engine knocking, the noise indicative of improper combustion in internal combustion engines
Pinking shears
An alternative name for pargeting

See also
Pinky (disambiguation)